Danijel Vrhovšek (born 8 September 1943) is a Slovenian former swimmer. He competed in the men's 100 metre backstroke at the 1968 Summer Olympics for Yugoslavia.

References

1943 births
Living people
Slovenian male swimmers
Olympic swimmers of Yugoslavia
Swimmers at the 1968 Summer Olympics
Sportspeople from Celje
Male backstroke swimmers